In mathematics, Schur algebras, named after Issai Schur, are certain finite-dimensional algebras closely associated with Schur–Weyl duality between general linear and symmetric groups. They are used to relate the representation theories of those two groups. Their use was promoted by the influential monograph of J. A. Green first published in 1980. The name "Schur algebra" is due to Green. In the modular case (over infinite fields of positive characteristic) Schur algebras were used by Gordon James and Karin Erdmann to show that the (still open) problems of computing decomposition numbers for general linear groups and symmetric groups are actually equivalent. Schur algebras were used by Friedlander and Suslin to prove finite generation of cohomology of finite group schemes.

Construction 
The Schur algebra  can be defined for any commutative ring  and integers . Consider the algebra  of polynomials (with coefficients in ) in  commuting variables , 1 ≤ i, j ≤ . Denote by  the homogeneous polynomials of degree . Thus

 

Now,  has a natural coalgebra structure with comultiplication  and counit  the algebra homomorphisms given on generators by

       (Kronecker's delta).

Since comultiplication is an algebra homomorphism,  is a bialgebra. One easily
checks that  is a subcoalgebra of the bialgebra , for every r ≥ 0.

Definition. The Schur algebra (in degree ) is the algebra .

It is a general fact that the linear dual of a coalgebra  is an algebra in a natural way, where the multiplication in the algebra is induced by dualizing the comultiplication in the coalgebra. To see this, let 
 
 

Main properties 

 One of the most basic properties expresses  as a centralizer algebra.

 
Then the symmetric group  on  letters acts naturally on the tensor space by place permutation, and one has an isomorphism 
 
In other words,  may be viewed as the algebra of endomorphisms of tensor space commuting with the action of the symmetric group.

 Schur algebras are "defined over the integers". This means that they satisfy the following change of scalars property:

 
for any commutative ring .

 Schur algebras provide natural examples of quasihereditary algebras (as defined by Cline, Parshall, and Scott), and thus have nice homological properties. In particular, Schur algebras have finite global dimension.

Generalizations 
 Generalized Schur algebras (associated to any reductive algebraic group) were introduced by Donkin in the 1980s. These are also quasihereditary.
 Around the same time, Dipper and James introduced the quantized Schur algebras (or q-Schur algebras for short), which are a type of q-deformation of the classical Schur algebras described above, in which the symmetric group is replaced by the corresponding Hecke algebra and the general linear group by an appropriate quantum group.
 There are also generalized q-Schur algebras, which are obtained by generalizing the work of Dipper and James in the same way that Donkin generalized the classical Schur algebras.
 There are further generalizations, such as the affine q-Schur algebras related to affine Kac–Moody Lie algebras and other generalizations, such as the cyclotomic q-Schur algebras related to Ariki-Koike algebras (which are q-deformations of certain complex reflection groups).

The study of these various classes of generalizations forms an active area of contemporary research.

References

Further reading 
 Stuart Martin, Schur Algebras and Representation Theory, Cambridge University Press 1993. , 
 Andrew Mathas, Iwahori-Hecke algebras and Schur algebras of the symmetric group, University Lecture Series, vol.15, American Mathematical Society, 1999. , 
 Hermann Weyl, The Classical Groups. Their Invariants and Representations. Princeton University Press, Princeton, N.J., 1939. , 

Algebra
Representation theory